Aligholi Ardalan (also Romanized as Aliqoli Ardalān; 25 January 1900– 2 August 1986) was one of the leading Iranian diplomats of his generation. He served as the minister of industry, the cabinet minister for foreign affairs and as ambassador to the United States, the USSR, and West Germany. He was also managing director of the National Iranian Oil Company for Southern Iran.

Biography
Ardalan was born in Tehran on 25 January 1900. From 1924 to 1927 he served as deputy of the Iranian embassy in Berlin.  He received a Doctorate from Frederick Wilhelm University, Berlin (now Humboldt University of Berlin) having written his thesis on the 'Position of Iranians in the world economy' (dated 23 November 1929) in impeccable German. He joined the Iranian Ministry of Foreign Affairs at the age of 30, and became political officer at the Iranian Embassy in Washington DC. From 14 May 1958 to 16 March 1960 he functioned as ambassador to the United States. Then he was appointed Iran's ambassador to the Soviet Union.

Ardalan was the only Iranian diplomat during the Cold War who served at the United Nations, Washington and Moscow during his tenure as diplomat. He was fluent in German, French, English, Kurdish and Persian.

Personal life 
Ardalan married in 1939 to Mehri Esfandiary, grand-daughter of Haj Mohtasham Saltaneh Esfandiari, President of the Majles for many years. She bore him two sons: Manoutchehr and Cyrus.

References

External links

1900 births
1986 deaths
Ambassadors of Iran to the United States
Ambassadors to West Germany
20th-century Iranian politicians
Politicians from Tehran
Ambassadors of Iran to the Soviet Union
Government ministers of Iran
Foreign ministers of Iran
Cold War diplomats